Koforidua Senior High Technical School, is one of the best secondary technical schools in Ghana. The school is located at Koforidua, the capital of Eastern Region in southern Ghana. Koforidua Secondary technical also called Sec-Tech, is a Senior High School located in Koforidua in the Eastern Region of Ghana. , the school has over 2,200 students.

History
The school was established in the year 1967 by Dr. Kwame Nkrumah. It was the second secondary technical school after Ghana Secondary Technical School (GSTS) in Takoradi. 

The school began as an all-boys school. Girls were later admitted for the first time in 1991, but only made up 5% of the student population in 2001.Till date the population of girls has not improved, therefore many people including student think it should be made a permanent all-boys school. The school taught mainly General Science and Technicals after its establishment but eventually added other courses over the years as it goes by.

Facilities
The Old Students association, named after the school slogan Mmarima Mma, began constructing a ¢7,000,000 assembly hall in 2018.The school has four houses and two other houses are under construction. The school has the nicest dining hall in koforidua

Academics
Academically, the school is well-noted. The school is classed among the Class A schools in Ghana.

In 2011 the first four-year program badge of the school set an unprecedented record in making the highest passes in the West African Senior High School Council Examination (WASSCE) with a maximum of 200 students getting A+ in all eight examinations. 488 students were registered for the WASSCE and 485 students passed in eight subjects. Making the school the 2nd best in the Eastern Region after St. Peters Senior High School. The school has made great improvements throughout the years. In 2012, the results were impressive bringing out more than 16 students scoring 8 A's in the WASSCE examinations and many more number of 7 A's.

Notable alumni 

Benedict Ernest Donkor, a Ghanaian pilot
DJ Aroma, a Ghanaian DJ
Vision DJ,a Ghanaian Dj
Prince Tagoe,a Ghanaian Footballer
Scofray Nana Yaw Yeboah, a Ghanaian writer
Wutah Kobby, Ghanaian Musician
Frederick Mintah, Founder at GDS Consulting gdsconsulting.africa
Samuel Nii Odai, Vice Chancellor, Accra Technical University
Jonathan Amoako Baah, CEO GRIDCO

In Pictures

References

External links 
 Website

High schools in Ghana
Education in the Eastern Region (Ghana)
Koforidua
Educational institutions established in 1967
1967 establishments in Ghana